Millard Milo Kapitz (July 31, 1906 in Rib Lake, Wisconsin – December 29, 1978) was a member of the Wisconsin State Assembly. During World War II, he served in the United States Navy.

Political career
Kapitz was elected to the Assembly in 1950. Additionally, he was a member of the Taylor County, Wisconsin Board, serving as Vice Chairman from 1941 to 1943 and Chairman from 1947 to 1950. He was a Republican.

References

People from Taylor County, Wisconsin
County supervisors in Wisconsin
Military personnel from Wisconsin
United States Navy sailors
United States Navy personnel of World War II
1906 births
1978 deaths
20th-century American politicians
Republican Party members of the Wisconsin State Assembly